is a former Japanese football player.

Club career
Tsuchida was born in Okayama on February 1, 1967. After graduating from Osaka University of Economics, he joined Japan Soccer League club Mitsubishi Motors (later Urawa Reds) in 1989. He played many matches as goalkeeper from 1991. In 1992, Japan Soccer League was folded and founded new league J1 League. He battles with Yuki Takita for the position for a long time. He played as regular goalkeeper in 1994 and 1995. However he lost regular position for injury in 1996, and his opportunity to play decreased from 1997. He could not play at all in the matches from 1999. He retired with rival Takita end of 2000 season.

National team career
In 1988, when Tsuchida was an Osaka University of Economics student, he was selected Japan national "B team" for 1988 Asian Cup. At this competition, he played one game. However, Japan Football Association don't count as Japan national team match because this Japan team was "B team" not "top team"

Club statistics

References

External links

1967 births
Living people
Osaka University of Economics alumni
Association football people from Okayama Prefecture
Japanese footballers
Japan Soccer League players
J1 League players
J2 League players
Urawa Red Diamonds players
1988 AFC Asian Cup players
Association football goalkeepers